This is a list of films produced by the Tollywood film industry based in Hyderabad in the year 1943.

References

External links
 Earliest Telugu language films at IMDb.com (82 to 87)

1943
Telugu
Telugu films